Arendtsøya is a small island in Kong Ludvigøyane, part of Thousand Islands, an island group south of Edgeøya. The island is named after the German geographer Karl Arendts (1815–81).

References

 Norwegian Polar Institute Place Names of Svalbard Database.

Islands of Svalbard